Zaozyorny is a town and the administrative center of Rybinsky District of Krasnoyarsk Krai, Russia, located on the Barga River (Yenisei's basin), the affluent of the Kan,  east of Krasnoyarsk on the 4,263rd km of the Trans-Siberian Railway (Zaozyornaya railway station). Population:

Etymology
The name of the town is an adjective meaning "beyond the lakes", referring to the lakes in the south the town is abutting.

History

It was established in 1776 as the sloboda of Troitsko-Zaozyornaya in the land owned by the Troitsko-Turukhansky Monastery. The main occupation of the settlers was mica mining; later placer mining. In 1934, it was granted urban-type settlement status and renamed Zaozyorny due to the anti-religious matters (the "Troitsko-" part of the name means "of the Trinity"). It was granted town status in 1948.

Administrative and municipal status
Within the framework of administrative divisions, Zaozyorny serves as the administrative center of Rybinsky District. As an administrative division, it is incorporated within Rybinsky District as the district town of Zaozyorny. As a municipal division, the district town of Zaozyorny is incorporated within Rybinsky Municipal District as Zaozyorny Urban Settlement.

Economy
In the Soviet era, a number of plants and factories were built in Zaozyorny: electronic parts, brick, baking with a huge grain elevator, milk, furniture, and sewing factories. All of them become barely functional after the dissolution of the Soviet Union. In the beginning of the 2000s, the furniture and sewing factories were funded by the Krasnoyarsk companies and became functional again, while the mica mill yet remains in crisis.

In 2002 and 2006, the town faced a critical situation with the central heating functionality due to the local government's financial crisis.

References

Notes

Sources

External links
Comprehensive article on the history of the town (up to the 1980s) 
Mojgorod.ru. Entry on Zaozyorny 
The Trans-Siberian Railway stations of the Eastern Siberia 
Zaozyorny news 
Coat of arms 
Weather in Zaozyorny 

Cities and towns in Krasnoyarsk Krai
Yeniseysk Governorate
Populated places established in 1776